A master of ceremonies is an official host of a staged event or similar performance.

Master of Ceremonies may also refer to:

Royal household positions
 Master of Ceremonies (Sweden), a position in the Royal Court of Sweden
 Master of the Ceremonies, a position within the British Royal Household
 Grand Master of Ceremonies of France, a position in the former French monarchy
 Grand Master of the Ceremonies, head of the Board of Ceremonies in the Japanese Imperial Household Agency
 Kōke, or "Master of Ceremonies", a position held by some samurai during the Edo period in Japan

Music
 Master of Ceremonies (Styles P album), 2011
 Master of Ceremonies, an unreleased album by Manntis
 "Master of Ceremonies", a spoken-word track by Pink Floyd from Is There Anybody Out There? The Wall Live 1980–81, 2000
 Master of ceremonies, or emcees in rapping